Tron (sometimes spelled Tronden, Tronfjell, or Trondfjell) is a prominent mountain in Innlandet county, Norway. The mountain lies just to the northeast of the village of Alvdal and just northwest of the village of Tylldalen.

There is a toll road to the summit that is open in the summers. The road was built while installing a broadcasting antenna in the 1960s, being Norway's second highest road.

The Indian philosopher Swami Sri Ananda Acharya (1883-1945) lived on the mountain for large periods of his life.

Etymology
The name Tron is the finite form of the word trond which means 'hog' (it is common in Norway to compare the shape of a mountain with an animal).

See also
 List of mountains of Norway
 Trondenes

References

Alvdal
Tynset
Mountains of Innlandet